Henry Gee, FSA (1858–1938) was an Anglican dean in the first half of the 20th century.

He was  educated at Exeter College, Oxford and ordained in 1877. In 1880 he was appointed by Dr. Boultbee as junior tutor at the London College of Divinity, where he later advanced to tutor and vice-principal, until he resigned in January 1900 to become Principal of Bishop's College, Ripon. From May 1902 he was Master of University College, Durham and in 1910 was appointed Professor of Church History at Durham University, a post he held for 8 years until his appointment as Dean of Gloucester. He died on 23 December 1938.

Notes

1858 births
Alumni of Exeter College, Oxford
Academics of Durham University
Deans of Gloucester
Fellows of the Society of Antiquaries of London
1938 deaths
Masters of University College, Durham
Surtees Society